Peter Tufts (1617 – May 13, 1700) was a prominent early citizen of Medford, Massachusetts, and ancestor of Charles Tufts who donated land for the Tufts University campus. The Peter Tufts House is still standing; it is believed by some historians to be the oldest all-brick house in the United States.

Peter Tufts (also spelled "Tuffts" and Tuffes") immigrated from Wilby, Norfolk, England to Charlestown, Massachusetts where he is recorded in 1637 "on the Malden side (of Charlestown)." By 1638 he owned  there. In early 1647 Peter, along with William Bridge, became ferryman on the Mystic River, succeeding Philip Drinker in that role. This ferry, later known as the Penny Ferry, served the inhabitants of Malden and the upper towns until 1787 when it was superseded by the Malden Bridge. By 1647 Peter had located to Malden, Massachusetts where he was one of the earliest and largest land owners; he also owned land on Mystic Side.

Tufts' involvement in the Salem witch trials was thus described in the 1889 History of Malden:

Peter Tufts of Mystic Side, who many times during a long life appears in court records and files, and not always as a desirable neighbor, also complained of them [Elizabeth Fosdick of Malden & Elizabeth Paine of Mystic Side]...Complaint v. Eliz Fosdick & Eliz Paine, Salem, Mary the 30th 1692: "Lt. Nathaniell putnam and Joseph Whipple both of Salem Village made Complaint in behalfe of theire majesty against Elizabeth fosdick of Maulden (sic) the wife of John fosdick afores Carpenter & Elizabeth paine off Charlestown the wife of Stephen paine of said place husbandman for sundry acts of Witchcraft by them Committed Lately on the bodies of Marcy Lewis and Mary Warren of Salen Village or farmes to theire great hurt therefore crauses Justice. Signed Nathaniel Putnam & Joseph Whipple. The abovesayd Complaint was Exhibited before us Salem May the 30th 1692. Signed John Hathorne and Jonathan Corwin. peter Tuft of Charlestown also appeared before us Salem June 2, 1692 and also Complained against both ye aboves for acts of Witchcraft by them Committed on his negro Woman. The mark of Peter Tufts +".

Tufts was recorded as a Freeman of Malden and the Massachusetts Bay Colony May 3, 1665 and October 15, 1679 (NEHGS "Register"), and was the first representative from Medford to the Massachusetts General Court. His will is recorded in Middlesex County, Massachusetts as #22994, dated March 1, 1693 with codicils of July 8, 1695 and June 13, 1698, and executed June 10, 1701. He is buried at Malden Church Yard, also known as Bell Rock Cemetery.

References 
 The History of Malden, Massachusetts, 1633-1785, Deloraine Pendre Corey, 1899.
 Medford Historical Register, vol. 29.
 Register, New England Historic Genealogical Society (NEHGS), vol 3, pp. 239 & 245.

1617 births
1700 deaths
People from Medford, Massachusetts
People of the Salem witch trials
People from Malden, Massachusetts